Natalia Belchenko, also spelled Beltchenko (born January 7, 1973) is a Ukrainian poet and translator.

Early life and education 
Natalia Belchenko was born on January 7, 1973, in Kyiv. She completed studies in Philology at the Taras Shevchenko National University of Kyiv.

Career 
Natalia Belchenko debuted in 1997, with a book titled Sleep Warden. She has published nine poetry collections. Belchenko is a laureate of several awards, including the Hubert-Burda-Preis für junge Lyrik (2000) and the National Writer’s Union of Ukraine Mykola Ushakov Prize in Literature (2006). In 2017 she won a scholarship from the Polish Ministry of Culture and National Heritage “Gaude Polonia” program. Her poems have been translated into German, French, English, Bulgarian, Korean, Dutch, Polish, Lithuanian, Latvian and Hebrew.

Apart from writing, Belchenko also works as a literary translator, translating from Ukrainian and Belarusian into Russian and from Polish to Ukrainian. She has translated, among others, works by Vasyl Makhno, Marianna Kiyanovska, Olesya Mamchich, Yuriy Izdryk, Zuzanna Ginczanka, Jarosław Iwaszkiewicz and Bolesław Leśmian. She is a recipient of "Metaphor" Translation Award (2014) and placed third in an International competition for the best Russian, Belarusian and Ukrainian translations of Wisława Szymborska poetry (2015).

Belchenko is a member of PEN Ukraine.

Publications 

 Sleep Warden, 1997
 Transit, 1998
 Karman imën Pocket of Names, 2002
 Creature in the Landscape, 2006
 Ответные губы (Reciprocal Lips), 2008
 A Wanderer/Fugitive, 2010
 Zrimorodok, 2013
 Знаки і знади (Signs and temptations), 2018

References 

Ukrainian translators
Ukrainian women poets
Taras Shevchenko National University of Kyiv alumni
Poets from Kyiv
1973 births
Living people
Translators from Polish
Translators from Belarusian
Ukrainian–Russian translators